Willesden Junction is a railway station in Harlesden, north-west London, UK. It is served by both London Overground and London Underground services.

History

Passenger services ended in 1962 when the platforms were removed during the electrification of the WCML to allow the curvature of the tracks to be eased. Later the bridges for the North London Line (NLL) were rebuilt.

The High-Level station on the NLL was opened by the North London Railway in 1869 for two Richmond tracks and later for two Shepherds Bush tracks, both crossing the WCML roughly at right angles. In 1894 a new, combined High-Level station was built, with an island platform plus a third shorter platform for Earls Court trains (which was later removed) together with a new station entrance building which still survives. By 1897 199 passengers and 47 goods trains passed through the High-Level station each day. The 'Willesden New Station' or Low-Level station on the Watford DC Line was opened in 1910 to the north of the main line with two outer through platforms and two inner bay platforms at the London end. The bay platforms were originally long enough for four-coach Bakerloo trains when such trains ran outside peak times, but were shortened in the 1960s when a new toilet block was installed; in more recent times the platform buildings have been reconstructed and the bay length increased due to the addition of a fourth and then a fifth coach to class 378 trains.

In 1896 staff totalled 271, including 79 porters, 58 signalmen (in 14 signal boxes) and 58 shunters and yard foremen. They issued 1,006,886 tickets to passengers in 1896, up from 530,300 in 1886. Many of them were housed in what is now the Old Oak Lane conservation area, built by the LNWR in 1889 and which included an Institute, reading room and church.

The main-line platforms were numbered from the south side (including one or two on the Kensington route) followed by the high level platforms and then the DC line platforms which thus had the highest numbers. Later the surviving platforms were renumbered.

A freight liner terminal was opened in August 1967. It was built on an 18-acre site of the steam locomotive depot alongside the main electrified rail-link.  It was opened by John Morris, Parliamentary Secretary for the Ministry of Transport. The terminal had the capacity to handle 2,000 containers a week.

In the late nineteenth century, it was nicknamed "Bewildering Junction" or "The Wilderness" because it contained such a maze of entrances, passages and platforms.

Accidents and incidents
In July 1858, a train driver - William Pine - was killed when two trains collided at the station.  The London to Rugby train was diverted onto the Kew line and struck the train that William Pine was driving. A point man employed at the station - Henry Lamb - subsequently absconded. He was captured by the police a month later in Hereford and charged with manslaughter. Lamb was tried at the Central Criminal Court in October 1858 and he was found not guilty.
On 31 May 1873, a mutilated body of a man was found on the railway track near the station. The victim had been hit by the Irish Mail train as it traveled from London to Rugby.
A fire broke out in the Kew and Richmond line ticket office during the morning of Saturday 4 April 1874. The fire gutted booking office and the adjoining rooms, and at one point threatened to engulf the entire station. Rail traffic was delayed by two hours.
On 11 November 1879, a passenger train collided with a goods train. Nobody was hurt.  A later investigation established that the accident was caused by a signaling error.
In September 1880, a young child was killed when he tried to step onto a moving wagon, but fell onto the track and was crushed.
In the evening of 6 April 1892, the body of a woman was discovered in the ladies bathroom. Station porters were closing up the station when the body was found in a locked closet. The victim died from razor wounds to the neck. An inquest later established that she had committed suicide.
On 22 June 1895, the axle of the London to Scotland express broke as it was leaving the station, blocking the line. No one was injured in the incident.
In July 1903, a laborer - John Pearson - attempted to commit suicide at the station by throwing himself under an approaching locomotive,  He fell between the rails and the engine passed over him, causing only minor bruising.  He was later charged at West London Police-court with attempted suicide. A doctor certified him to be insane and the magistrate ordered his detention at a local workhouse Infirmary.
In August 1903, a Congregational minister – the Rev. W. Horn – died in the station waiting room. He collapsed after running to catch a train.
On 11 November 1907, the London and North Western train from Mansion House ran into a stationary North London engine. Four railway men were injured.
In March 1908, a young ticket collector working at the station stumbled while crossing the rail track. His leg was caught under a passing train and subsequently amputated.
On 5 December 1910, a passenger train was in a rear-end collision with another at the station. Five people were killed and more than 40 were injured. The accident was due to a signaling error.
An elderly woman suffering from dementia and memory loss was discovered on an empty train carriage. The train had arrived from Liverpool on midnight, 6 August 1913. The woman gave a false address, did not have money and was not in possession of a ticket. The woman was transferred to Willesden Workhouse Infirmary. While in the Infirmary, the woman had difficulty communicating.
In January 1916 Alfred Charles Norgrove, aged 21, was killed when he was accidentally struck by the footplate of a moving train.  He was employed as a fireman by the L. & N. W Railway Company at Willesden Junction. He was in the Territorial Army but had been temporarily discharged through having a bad cold, and was waiting to be called up again.
On 20 March 1920, the Manchester express was forced to stop at the station when a young man was found to be lying on the buffer of the last carriage. The man was later identified as a soldier - Henry Marshall, age 16 - who was absent without leave. Marshall was later handed over to a military escort.
In August 1923, a vehicle carrying 50 children overturned as it approached the station. The children were about to board a train for a trip to the country. Seven children and their teacher was subsequently admitted to Park Royal Hospital.
A young man - William Webb - was found guilty of loitering at the station in December 1928.  When arrested he was in possession of 29 betting slips. and 41 football betting coupons. He was previously observed by railway staff taking bets at the railway station.
In June 1936, one first-class passenger was killed and four other passengers were injured on the main line track just north of the station. An LMS passenger train heading to Watford was struck by a piece of equipment sticking out of the milk train heading to Euston.
On 16 March 1940, passengers were forced to walk 150 yards to the station, when their LMS line train from Clapham Junction derailed near the station.
Two shunters working at Willesden Junction were fined in April 1941 for stealing goods while in transit on the railway.
On 22 April 1949 two thieves attempted to rob the wages of the station railway workers. The thieves, who were armed with cudgels, attacked railway cashier Nigel Woolsley and John White, a labourer who accompanied him, as they walked along the lines. The thieves hit Woolsley and grabbed the wage bag containing £1,250.  Woolsley tackled one bandit and got the bag back while White fought off the other man. Both thieves fled. Then, when Woolsley had been given first aid, he paid out the wages.
Over six hundred passengers were trapped on a Bakerloo line train held at a cutting near the station. On the evening of 6 August 1952, a violent storm created a flood that prevented the train from moving. Passengers were trapped for four hours and were eventually rescued by the local fire brigade.
In August 1956, Willesden Junction was one of seven stations where British Rail banned the activities of train spotters. British Rail expressed concern about the unruly behavior of trainspotters and the disruption they caused to regular passengers. The ban proved to be extremely unpopular and it was quickly lifted.
On 11 December 1967 a major security alert was launched at the station. Two wagons containing £20 million in cash became detached from its engine, leaving the cash stranded at the station. Police and railway officials put a cordon around the wagons for two hours while a new engine arrived to transport the cash northwards.
In July 1969, an empty train, travelling to Euston to be cleaned, ran into the back of the Bletchley train. It brought down an electricity pylon near the station. Trains between London and the midlands were severely delayed. No passengers were hurt but the two driver and a guard were slightly injured and taken to hospital. Three carriages of the Bletchley train were derailed.
In March 1971, a petrol tanker containing 75 tons of paraffin derailed just outside the station. It jumped the track as it crossed the bridge on the high level part of the station. The derailment caused long delays on the Broad Street to Richmond line.
On 6 October 1986 at 17:00 a class 313 train collided with the rear of a stationary Bakerloo line train on the up line to the east of the station between the Scrubbs Lane overbridge and Kensal Green tunnel (the location was officially described as "Kensal Green"). 23 of 25 passengers were injured, all but one were discharged from hospital during the same evening.
On 14 September 1990, a North London Line commuter train from Richmond was accidentally sent on to a dedicated freight line to Willesden Junction. A signal man had pulled the wrong lever sending the train onto the wrong line. The freight line was not electrified and the passenger train stopped almost immediately. No one was injured.

The station today
There are no platforms on the West Coast Main Line, which is separated from the low-level station by the approach road to Willesden Depot which lies immediately south-east of the station.

The high-level (HL) station consists of an island platform rebuilt in 1956, with faces as platforms 4 and 5, which are roughly at the level of Old Oak Lane to the west of the station, serving the NLL and the West London Line; some trains on the latter reverse in a central turnback siding on the NLL to the east of the station, this opened in 2011. Both platforms have been extended across the DC line to accommodate 4-coach class 378 trains. The HL station previously had a third platform on the eastern side which was used by services to/from Earls Court.
There is another turnback siding further east which was previously used; it was laid in the late 1990s to allow Royal Mail trains to reach the Royal Mail depot at Stonebridge Park.

The low-level station, at the level of the area to the south, is an Edwardian island platform, with outer faces as platforms 1 and 3 and northern bay platform bay as platform 2, the southern bay now has no track. In October 2014 the DC line was closed temporarily between Wembley Central and Queens Park reportedly by Network Rail (London Overground) to allow platform 2 to be extended further west as a through platform. Most of the original and later platform buildings were demolished when platform 2 was extended in preparation for longer  trains and provision of a new footbridge and lift in 1999.

Until May 2008 north-bound Bakerloo line trains which were to reverse at  depot (two stations further north) ran empty from Willesden Junction although the southbound service began at Stonebridge Park. This imbalance arose as there were no London Underground staff beyond Willesden Junction to oversee passenger detrainment, but this changed after London Underground took over the staffing of stations on the line, including Stonebridge Park, from Silverlink in November 2007, and trains bound for Stonebridge Park depot now terminate at Stonebridge Park station. Normally only the first and last NLL trains of the day, which start or terminate here, use the bay platform, though it is used for empty stock transfers between the depot and the North London and Gospel Oak to Barking lines.

The station signs on the platforms say, below the Overground roundel, "Alight for Harlesden town centre".

Motive power depot

The LNWR opened a large locomotive depot on a site on the south side of the main line to the west of the station, in 1873. This was enlarged in 1898. The London Midland and Scottish Railway opened an additional roundhouse on the site in 1929. Both buildings were demolished when the depot was closed in 1965 by British Railways and replaced by a Freightliner depot. (The servicing of locomotives and multiple units was then undertaken by the present Willesden TMD on the other side of the line.)

The steam depot had the shed code 1A and was a major depot for predominantly freight locomotives used on the West Coast Main Line and for suburban passenger services from Euston.

Services

London Overground services are operated by  Capitalstar units on the North London and West London lines, and Class 378 Capitalstar and Class 710 Aventras units on the Watford DC line. The typical off-peak North London Line, West London Line and Watford DC Line services at the station in trains per hour are:

Southern services travelling between Watford Junction and East Croydon, and slow London Northwestern Railway services travelling between London Euston and Tring, currently do not stop at this station, as there are currently no platforms provided on the lines which previously passed through the southernmost platforms of the main line station, and which now form the up and down Willesden relief lines. However, in the future, there is a proposed plan for these services to stop here, which will involve building new platforms on the WCML. A study in 2017 suggests there would be two new platforms for slow main line services to stop (the existing London Northwestern Railway and Southern services).

Bus connections

The station area is served by London Buses routes 18, 220, 228, 266, 487 and night route N18.

References

External links

London Transport Museum Photographic Archive

Willesden Junction, SubBrit stations project
 , description of the station in the 1930s

Bakerloo line stations
Tube stations in the London Borough of Brent
DfT Category C2 stations
Railway stations in the London Borough of Brent
Former London and North Western Railway stations
Railway stations in Great Britain opened in 1866
Railway stations served by London Overground
1866 establishments in England